L-3 MPRI, was a global provider of private military contractor services with customers that included U.S. Department of Defense, U.S. Department of State, U.S. Department of Justice, U.S. Department of Homeland Security, law enforcement agencies, foreign governments, government agencies and commercial businesses.

L-3 MPRI was based in Alexandria, Virginia. L-3 MPRI's President was retired US Army General Bantz J. Craddock. The CEO was Carl E. Vuono.

History
Incorporated in 1987 and founded as MPRI by eight former senior military leaders. Former Army Chief of Staff Carl E. Vuono joined MPRI in 1993. General William F. Kernan of the U.S. Army also joined the firm after his military service.

Acquired in June 2000, L-3 MPRI is a division of L-3 Communications Corporation. L-3 specializes in Command, Control and Communications, Intelligence, Surveillance and Reconnaissance (C3ISR), government services, training and simulation, aircraft modernization and maintenance, and has a broad base of electronic systems. L-3 is also a major provider of homeland defense products and services.

L-3 MPRI was included in the spin off L-3's Government Services group to create a new independent company ENGILITY Corporation.

Training
MPRI began by almost exclusively employing retired U.S. military personnel.

It used retired military personnel and current U.S. National Guard or reservists, to run Reserve Officer Training Corps programs at more than 200 universities. Other employees have worked in U.S. Army recruitment centers and trained U.S. soldiers. With offices in other countries, employees also have trained foreign armies at ranges in Bosnia and Herzegovina, Iraq, Kuwait, and South Africa. MPRI had reassured their clients with services from teams of military leaders, law enforcement officers, strategic analysts, disaster management experts, and diplomatic and private sector leaders.

In 1995 before Operation Storm, there is considerable circumstantial evidence to suggest that MPRI prepared and trained the Croatian Army for its offensive to retake the Krajina region. In April 1995, Democracy Transition Assistance Program (DTAP) training began at the "Petar Zrinski" military school in Zagreb. Deborah Avant discusses the controversy in her book The Market for Force: The Consequences of Privatizing Security. MPRI provided (along with a French Foreign Legion organized training camp in Šepurine near Zadar) mainly training for commissioned officers, but a 1999 study published in the journal of the U.S. Army War College concluded that the company had no significant intelligence activities or professional influence on senior Croatian military strategy and tactics. Its engagement was approved by the U.S. government.

Local forces in Croatia were referred to MPRI by the United States Department of Defense and used their training. 120 African leaders and more than 5,500 African troops have been trained by MPRI on security issues.
 
MPRI started training the Army of the Federation of Bosnia and Herzegovina for $140 million, after 1995 when the Dayton Accords were established. On the back of its success in Croatia, MPRI won the approximately $50 million ‘Train and Equip’ contract for the Bosnian Federation army, which ran from July 1996. The training contract was accompanied by an approximately $100 million arms transfer program. The contract began with restructuring the Ministry of Defence and claimed to create a combined logistics system between the initial separate Muslim and Croat armies. While the contractors claimed they had combined the logistics system, assessments made in the 2000s disagreed: ‘the force integration of the Federation army has been superficial and limited to some cooperation at the HQ level.’ The contract also included development of training policy, assisting with unit training, establishment of a central combat training centre, including a school at Hadzici and a field combat simulation centre at Livno. While the facilities may have been constructed, whether the training and logistics systems changes lasted is uncertain, given Maxwell’s assessment.

MPRI trained security forces were used to defeat an attack on the presidential palace of Equatorial Guinea's long-serving dictator Teodoro Obiang Nguema.

Defense contracts
In the early 1990s, MPRI signed a 5-year contract with the U.S. State Department involving the shipment of donated medical supplies and food to former Soviet states.

In 1998, the government of Equatorial Guinea asked MPRI to evaluate its defense systems, particularly its need for a coast guard to protect its oil reserves. To be eligible for the job, MPRI needed a license from the U.S. State Department. The Clinton administration rejected the request, citing the West African nation's human rights record. In 2000, after lobbying by MPRI, the State Department issued the license. MPRI did not reveal the terms of its contract with Equatorial Guinea.

In 1999 MPRI signed an 18-month, $4.3 million contract to work with military in Colombia on the drug war. The contract expired in March 2001 and was not renewed allegedly because the Colombian Defense Ministry and its officers were upset by recommendations such as "Hit the enemy with a closed fist; do not poke at him with fingers of an open hand." (Note: this is a maxim of World War II German General Heinz Guderian.) 
 
According to a United States Department of Defense census, MPRI has at least 500 employees working in Iraq on 12 different contracts including mentoring civilian workers at the Ministry of Defense.

MPRI under a US Department of Defense contract conducted training and advisory services for the Afghan National Army (ANA). Also supported in various areas logistical and advisory services in regional areas of Afghanistan.

MPRI is a contractor for the US State Department Bureau of African Affairs with training in African countries to include Uganda, with emphasis on pre-deployment training of UPDF en route to support African Union initiatives in Somalia.

Lawsuit
A group of Serbs who lived in Krajina until Operation Storm sued MPRI accusing them for "participation in genocide", militarily equipping the Croatian Armed Forces, training the Croatian officers and developing a plan of Operation Storm. The claim was presented to the Federal Court in Chicago, and plaintiffs were asking for $10.4 billion compensation.

On September 26, 2014 the lawsuit was rejected by Judge John Lee because the war in former Yugoslavia is not under jurisdiction of this court.

References

Further reading 
 Deborah Avant, 'The Market for Force: The Consequences of Privatising Security,' Cambridge University Press, 2005
 Fred Tanner, Security Sector Reform: Lessons from Bosnia and Hercegovina, Geneva Centre for Security Policy, paper prepared for DCAF-IISS Workshop on Security Sector Reform, 23–24 April 2001

External links
 America’s For-Profit Secret Army

Companies based in Alexandria, Virginia
Private military contractors
American companies established in 1987